The Helite Skydancer is a French powered parachute that was designed and produced by La Mouette of Messigny-et-Vantoux under their Helite brand. Now out of production, when it was available the aircraft was supplied as a complete ready-to-fly-aircraft.

The aircraft is no longer advertised for sale by either La Mouette or Helite. In 2015 Helite was singularly a producer of air bag products.

Design and development
It features a parachute-style wing, two-seats-in-tandem accommodation, tricycle landing gear and a single  Rotax 582 engine in pusher configuration.

The aircraft carriage is built from a combination of bolted aluminium and 4130 steel tubing. In flight steering is accomplished via foot pedals that actuate the canopy brakes, creating roll and yaw. On the ground the aircraft has lever-controlled nosewheel steering. The main landing gear incorporates spring rod suspension.

Specifications (Skydancer)

References

Helite Skydancer
2000s French sport aircraft
2000s French ultralight aircraft
Single-engined pusher aircraft
Powered parachutes